Fuzzball may refer to:

 Fuzzball (sport), a variation of baseball similar to stickball
 Fuzzball (string theory), an alternative quantum description of black holes
 Fuzzball router, the first modern routers on the Internet
 Fuzzball, a cartoon appearing in the TV series KaBlam!
 Fuzzball, the playable character in the 1990 video game Freakin' Funky Fuzzballs
 Pill (textile), a small ball of fibers that forms on a piece of cloth

See also
 Fussball (disambiguation)
 Fuzzball MUCK, a 1995 online text-based role-playing game